Conny Andersson (born 8 April 1945) is a Swedish former footballer.

Andersson was known as the "Butcher of Hardeberga". When he transferred from IFK Malmö to Malmö FF in 1971 he became Sweden's most expensive football transfer.

Honours

Club
Malmö FF
Allsvenskan: 1971, 1974, 1975
Svenska Cupen: 1972-73, 1973-74, 1974-75

References

1945 births
Swedish footballers
Sweden international footballers
Malmö FF players
Allsvenskan players
Living people

Association football forwards